Llanfair Caereinion  railway station located in Llanfair Caereinion is the Western terminus of the  narrow gauge Welshpool and Llanfair Light Railway. The locomotive running shed and workshops are located here, along with a tea room and gift shop. The original corrugated iron booking office and waiting room survive and have been restored for use as the registered office of the company.

The station was opened on 6 April 1903.

The Great Western Railway withdrew passenger services on 9 February 1931. and the line closed completely on 3 November 1956. By 6 April 1963 the line had a passenger service restored by the Welshpool and Llanfair Railway.

Notes

References 
 
 Rushton, Gordon (2015). The Welshpool & Llanfair Railway  Travellers's Guide. Llanfair Caereinion : Welshpool & Llanfair Railway.

External links
 Video footage of Llanfaer Caereinion Station
 3 minutes from Welshpool to Llanfair Caereinion

Welshpool and Llanfair Light Railway
Heritage railway stations in Powys
Llanfair Caereinion
Former Cambrian Railway stations
Railway stations in Great Britain opened in 1903
Railway stations in Great Britain closed in 1931
Railway stations in Great Britain opened in 1963